This is a list of the Belgium national team games between 1905 and 1919. 

Throughout this period they only played friendlies, however, a substantial part of these can be considered to be part of minor tournaments, since all friendly matches against the Netherlands were played for a Cup: the Coupe Vanden Abeele during the matches in Belgium and the Rotterdamsch Nieuwsblad Beker when the encounter took place in the Netherlands. Throughout this period Belgium had their first international duels with France, Germany, Italy, Sweden and Switzerland. Because of the First World War, no matches were played in the years 1915-1918.

Between their first match against France in 1904 and 1919, Belgium played in 47 matches, resulting in a negative balance of 24 losses against 18 wins (and 5 draws).

Results
47 matches played:

Notes

See also
 Belgium national football team results

References

External links

 RSSSF archive of results 1904–
 eu-football.info Belgium national football team match results

football
1900s
football
1910s
1903–04 in Belgian football
1904–05 in Belgian football
1905–06 in Belgian football
1906–07 in Belgian football
1907–08 in Belgian football
1908–09 in Belgian football
1909–10 in Belgian football
1910–11 in Belgian football
1911–12 in Belgian football
1912–13 in Belgian football
1913–14 in Belgian football
1918–19 in Belgian football